Hyperolius zonatus is a species of frog in the family Hyperoliidae.
It is found in Ivory Coast, Guinea, Sierra Leone, and possibly Liberia.
Its natural habitats are subtropical or tropical moist lowland forests, swamps, and intermittent freshwater marshes.
It is threatened by habitat loss.

References

zonatus
Amphibians described in 1958
Taxonomy articles created by Polbot